The Georgetown University School of Health is one of the constituent schools of Georgetown University. The school was founded in 2022, with the partitioning of the School of Nursing & Health Studies into the School of Nursing and the School of Health.

List of deans

References 

Georgetown University Medical Center
Georgetown University schools
Educational institutions established in 2022
Jesuit universities and colleges in the United States
2022 establishments in Washington, D.C.